Petals ESB is an open-source ESB developed by Linagora. It is a tool for implementing a service-oriented architecture (SOA). It is standard, modular, and physically distributed, to adapt to large-scale infrastructures.

Petals ESB is based on JBI (JSR 208) industry specification. It was the first ESB certified by Sun Microsystems under the JSR 208 TCK. Based on standards, it also supports SOA standards such as BPMN and Enterprise Integration Patterns capabilities.

Fractal deployment framework, JBI pluggable components, and open source licensing make it modular and customizable.

The originality of Petals is to implement a highly distributed topology. The first stable version of Petals ESB, called PEtALS, was released on September 21, 2006.

Features
PEtALS main technical features :
 Scalable for large architectures, due to distributed topology
 JBI certified by Sun Microsystems
 Development tools: JBI component framework, Eclipse configuration plugin,
 Operating tools: Petals CLI, Petals Cockpit
 Quality of service: High availability (load balancing), Persistence, Security,
 Adaptable: Fractal modular framework, JBI plugins
 Connectors: SOAP (Web services), Rest, Local File, FTP/SFTP, HTTP, Quartz, JMS, SMTP/POP/IMAP, JDBC/SQL, EJB. Compatible with JBI plugins.
 Processing components : BPMN (Flowable), EIP (Apache Camel), XSLT, XSD validation, POJO/JSR181, RMI.

See also
Enterprise Integration Patterns
Enterprise Messaging System
Message Oriented Middleware
Mule
Servicemix
OpenESB
Guaraná DSL

References

External links
https://web.archive.org/web/20150406045742/http://petals.ow2.org/index.html
ESB White paper, Adrien Louis, EBM Websourcing
article: Open Source Middleware tends PEtALS, CNET, Matthew Broersma, 26 October 2006
announcement: Version 2.0 of PEtALS ESB available

OW2
Java enterprise platform
Service-oriented architecture-related products
Enterprise application integration